Owl Ranch is an unincorporated community and census-designated place in Jim Wells County, Texas, United States. Its population was 225 as of the 2010 census. Prior to 2010, the community was grouped with nearby Amargosa as part of the Owl Ranch-Amargosa census-designated place.

Geography

Education
It is within the Alice Independent School District. The district operates Alice High School.

References

Unincorporated communities in Jim Wells County, Texas
Unincorporated communities in Texas
Census-designated places in Jim Wells County, Texas
Census-designated places in Texas